Juho Kinnunen (31 October 1909 – 8 July 1972) was a Finnish wrestler. He competed in the men's Greco-Roman middleweight at the 1948 Summer Olympics.

References

External links
 

1909 births
1972 deaths
Finnish male sport wrestlers
Olympic wrestlers of Finland
Wrestlers at the 1948 Summer Olympics